Davy Bonilla (born 29 September 1973) is a horse racing jockey based in France.

Major wins
 France
 Prix de l'Abbaye de Longchamp - (1) - Marchand d'Or (2008)
 Prix du Cadran - (1) - San Sebastian (2000)
 Prix d'Ispahan - (1) - Laverock (2006)
 Prix Jacques Le Marois - (1) - Tamayuz (2008)
 Prix Jean-Luc Lagardère - (1) - Naaqoos (2008)
 Prix Jean Prat - (1) - Tamayuz (2008)
 Prix Maurice de Gheest - (3) - Marchand d'Or (2006, 2007, 2008)

 Germany
 Deutsches Derby - (1) - Nicaron (2005)
 Preis von Europa - (1) - Golden Snake (2000)

 Great Britain
 July Cup - (1) - Marchand d'Or (2008)

 Italy
 Gran Premio del Jockey Club - (1) - Laverock (2006)

References
 hkjc.com – Hong Kong International Races jockey profiles
 ntra.com – Marchand d'Or repeats in Prix Maurice de Gheest
 thoroughbredtimes.com – Bonilla granted short-term riding license in Japan

1973 births
Living people
French jockeys